Yves Jean-Bart, nicknamed Dadou, (born 30 October 1947 in Aquin), was the President of the Haitian Football Federation until 20th October 2020, when he was banned for life following a sexual harassment investigation by The Guardian.

He was re-elected to the position for fifth time in January 2016.

In the wake of the suspension of Jack Warner and Lisle Austin in 2011, he became the acting president of the Caribbean Football Union.

Abuse allegations 
On 30 April 2020, he was accused of sexually abusing young female footballers, including one who was forced to have an abortion. On 20 November 2020, the FIFA Ethics Committee banned him for life from football activites for life.

References

Living people
Association football executives
Haitian businesspeople
1947 births
People from Sud (department)